Hyundai Automotive South Africa (Pty) Ltd. is a dealer network and automobile manufacturer based in Bedfordview, South Africa and a subsidiary of Hyundai.

History
The company was formed in 1999 as a collaboration between the holding company Associated Motor Holdings and Hyundai. It succeeded the dealer network Hyundai Motor Distributors (HMD).

The HMD network founded by Billy Rautenbach, with 52 branches, was able to offer vehicles that were inexpensively assembled by the Motor Company of Botswana and an extended warranty of three years. With these and other aggressive methods, it had achieved a ten percent market share in South Africa.

Hyundai has been assembling trucks in Gauteng since July 2014. In March 2015, the assembly of the H100 was added.

References

External links 
 Official Website

Hyundai Motor Company
Car manufacturers of South Africa
Companies based in Germiston
Vehicle manufacturing companies established in 1999
1999 establishments in South Africa
South African subsidiaries of foreign companies